This is a list of newspapers currently published in Curaçao, grouped by language.

Multiple Languages
Official
 Government News in Dutch and Papiamentu

Daily
 Extra – Papamientu and English

Papiamentu
Daily
 Vigilante

Websites
 Bohimio

Dutch
Daily
 Amigoe – published throughout the ABC islands 
 Antilliaans Dagblad

Websites
 Curacao.nu
 Knipselkrant Curaçao

English
Websites
 Curaçao Chronicle
 The Daily Herald (St Maarten newspaper with lots of coverage on Curaçao)

Spanish
Websites
 Noticias Curazao

See also
 List of newspapers

References

External links

Curaçao
 
Curaçao-related lists